Fort Hill is an unincorporated community in Polk and Yamhill counties in Oregon, United States. It is located about a mile east of Spirit Mountain Casino on Oregon Route 22 near the South Yamhill River. For statistical purposes, the United States Census Bureau has defined Fort Hill as a census-designated place (CDP). The census definition of the area may not precisely correspond to local understanding of the area with the same name. The hill of the same name, located just east of Valley Junction, was the site of a blockhouse built by settlers in 1855–1856. The blockhouse became part of Fort Yamhill, and was later moved to Grand Ronde Agency and is now located in Dayton.

References

External links
Images of Fort Hill from Flickr

Census-designated places in Oregon
Census-designated places in Polk County, Oregon
Census-designated places in Yamhill County, Oregon
Unincorporated communities in Polk County, Oregon
Unincorporated communities in Oregon